Sveti Rok is a village in the Lovinac municipality, in Lika–Senj County, Croatia. Sveti Rok has a population of 292. The majority of the population are Croats.

History 

Until 1918, Sveti Rok (named Sanct Roch before 1850) was part of the Austrian monarchy (Kingdom of Croatia-Slavonia after the compromise of 1867), in the Croatian Military Frontier, Likaner Regiment  N°I. The village named after Saint Roch.

Notable people
 Mile Budak

See also
 Sveti Rok Tunnel

References 

Populated places in Lika-Senj County